Françoise Morhange (1915–1984) was a French actress. In 1980, she starred in Le Voyage en douce under director Michel Deville.

Filmography

References

External links

French film actresses
20th-century French actresses
1915 births
1984 deaths